The title of King of the Road is given out once a year by Thrasher magazine. The tradition was started in 2003 by Thrasher editor Michael Burnett.

In the 'King of the Road' contest, three separate, pre-invited teams of professional skaters are each given a book containing a series of challenges. The challenges themselves involve hard skateboarding tasks, as well as more trivial and humorous ones. There are various points available for each challenge, usually dependent on how difficult or uncomfortable the challenge is. The teams compete at the same time over a two-week period, in which they travel across the U.S. to complete as many challenges as possible.

KOTR has been held annually since its inception, with the exceptions of 2008, 2009 and 2018. In 2011, Thrasher and Converse hosted an addition KOTR competition in China, with the participation of four Chinese skateboard brands.

King of the Road 2003

Teams

Team Deluxe
          Dan Drehobl
         Darrell Stanton
          JT Aultz
          Ernie Torres
          Tony Trujillo

Team Tum Yeto
         Ethan Fowler
          Gareth Stehr
          Diego Bucchieri
          Johnny Layton
          Adrian Mallory

Team Volcom
          Rune Glifberg
          Caswell Berry
          Dustin Dollin
          Dennis Busenitz
          Javier Sarmiento

Team éS
          Eric Koston
          Rick McCrank
          Paul Rodriguez
          PJ Ladd
          Alexis Sablone

Final standings

1st Place: Deluxe
2nd Place: Tum Yeto
3rd Place: Volcom
4th Place: éS

King of the Road 2004

Teams

Team Almost
          Daewon Song
          Greg Lutzka
          Chris Haslam
          Ryan Sheckler
          Cooper Wilt
Team Girl
          Eric Koston
          Mike Carroll
          Rick Howard
          Brian Anderson
          Jereme Rogers
Team Real
          Peter Ramondetta
          Dennis Busenitz
          Tony Trujillo
          Darrell Stanton
          Ernie Torres
Team Zero
          Jamie Thomas
          Jon Allie
          Tommy Sandoval
          Chris Cole
          James Brockman

Final standings

1st Place: Zero
2nd Place: Girl
3rd Place: Almost
4th Place: Real

King of the Road 2005

Teams

Team Zero

           Jamie Thomas
           Chris Cole
           Garrett Hill
           John Rattray
           Tommy Sandoval

Team Habitat
           Fred Gall
           Silas Baxter-Neal
           Stefan Janoski
           Kerry Getz
           Danny Garcia

Team Flip
           Geoff Rowley
           Bastien Salabanzi
           Shane Cross
           Arto Saari
           Alex Chalmers

Team Element
           Jeremy Wray
           Mike Vallely
           Brent Atchley
           Tosh Townend
           Colt Cannon

Final standings
 First Place : Zero 4,190 points
 Second Place : Habitat 3,470
 Third Place : Flip 3,460
 Fourth Place : Element 2,680

King of the Road 2006

Teams

Team Zero
          Jamie Thomas
          Chris Cole
          Tommy Sandoval
          John Rattray
          James Brockman

Team Darkstar
          Chet Thomas
          Paul Machnau
          Gailea Momolu
          Paul Trep
          Adam Dyet

Team Baker
          Andrew Reynolds
          Erik Ellington
          Jim Greco
          Bryan Herman
          Leo Romero

Team Toy Machine
          Ed Templeton
          Billy Marks
          Josh Harmony
          Johnny Layton
          Matt Bennett

Final standings

1st Place: Zero - 5,530 points
2nd Place: Darkstar - 4,610 points
3rd Place: Baker - 4,540 points
4th Place: Toy Machine - 3,690 points

King of the Road 2007

Teams

Team Blind
          Ronnie Creager
          Jake Duncombe
          James Craig
          Danilo Cerezini
          Morgan Smith

Team Foundation
          Don Nguyen
          Sierra Fellers
          David Reyes
          Angel Ramirez
          Abdias Rivera

Team Black Label
          Chet Childress
          Adam Alfaro
          Brian "Slash" Hansen
          Shuriken Shannon
          Chris Troy

Team Zoo York
          Zered Bassett
          Aaron Suski
          Anthony Shetler
          Lamare Hemmings
          Brandon Westgate

Final standings

1st Place: Blind
2nd Place: Foundation
3rd Place: Black Label
4th Place: Zoo York

King of the Road 2010 

1st Place
Team Nike SB
Eric Koston,
Grant Taylor,
Ishod Wair,
Cory Kennedy,
Justin Brock. 
Mystery Guest Marissa Del Santo.

2nd Place
Team C1RCA
David Gravette,
Scott Decenzo,
Sierra Fellers,
David Reyes,
Robbie Brockel. 
Mystery Guest Alexis Sablone.

3rd Place
Team Converse
Angel Ramirez,
Kenny Anderson,
Sammy Baca,
Julian Davidson,
Eli Reed. 
Mystery Guest Lacey Baker.

4th Place
Team Etnies
Sean Malto,
Mike Taylor,
Jose Rojo,
Willow,
Ryan Sheckler. 
Mystery Guest Elisa Steamer.

King of the Road 2011 

1st Place – 6060 points
Team Lakai
Guy Mariano,
Marc Johnson,
Daniel Espinoza,
Vincent Alvarez,
Mikemo Capaldi,
Sam Smyth TM,
Ryan Lovell, Videographer,
Joe Brook, on Photography,
Aaron Meza on 2nd Angle.
Mystery Guest Andrew Reynolds.

2nd Place – 5680 points
Team Vans
Tony Trujillo,
Elijah Berle,
Daniel Lutheran,
Johnny Layton,
Gilbert Crockett,
Griffin Collins TM,
Cody Green, Videographer, 
Joe Hammeke on Photography.
Mystery Guest Arto Saari.

3rd Place – 5480 points
Team Nike SB
Eric Koston,
Grant Taylor,
Ishod Wair,
Cory Kennedy,
Shane O’Neill,
Bob Reynolds TM,
Jason Hernandez, Videographer, 
Rhino on Photography,
Steve Chalme on 2nd Angle.
Mystery Guest Leo Romero.

4th Place – 5340 points
Team Dekline
Chad Tim-tim,
Matt Bennett,
Nick Merlino,
Dakota Servold,
Ryan Spencer,
Mike Sinclair TM,
Jared Lucas, Videographer,
Dan Zaslavsky on Photography,
Tim Cisilino on Second angle.
Mystery Guest Salman Agah.

King of the Road China 2011 
Presented by Converse

1st Place – 2930 Points
Team Gift
Mystery Guest Raymond Molinar.

2nd place - 2710
Team Shox
Mystery Guest Angel Ramirez.

3rd place - 2615
Team Society
Mystery Guest Kenny Anderson.

4th place - 1930
Team Vagabond
Mystery Guest ??? .

King of the Road 2012

King of the Road 2013

Teams 
Teams were announced August 27, 2013. People were able to follow each team via blogs on the Thrasher site.

Final Standings 
Winners were announced on September 19, 2013.
 Winning Team: Birdhouse
 Phelper's Choice: Raven Tershy
 MVP: Ryan Susim

Web Episodes 
The 2013 edition of KoTR was shown in a series of videos on the Thrasher site and on YouTube. 
 Teams Announced YT
 Team Riders Announced YT
 Teaser YT
 Episode 1 YT
 Episode 2 YT
 Episode 3 YT
 Episode 4 YT
 Episode 5 YT
 Episode 6 YT
 Episode 7 YT
 Episode 8 YT
 Episode 9 YT
 Episode 10 YT
 Episode 11 YT
 Episode 12 YT
 Episode 13 YT
 Episode 14 YT
 Episode 15 YT
 Episode 16 YT
 Meet The Mystery Guests YT
 Highest Longest Most YT
 Chocolate Yardsale YT
 Real Yardsale YT
 Birdhouse Yardsale YT

King of the Road 2014

Teams 
Team were announced September 3, 2014. Mystery guests were announced September 12, 2014 and were all featured in the Osiris video, "The Storm".

Final Standings 
Winning team was announced on December 13 in the final Web episode.
 Birdhouse
 Element
 Flip

Web Episode 
The 2014 edition of KoTR was shown in a series of web episodes on the Thrasher site and on YouTube. 
 Meet The Mystery Guests YT
 Episode 1 YT
 Episode 2 YT
 Episode 3 YT
 Episode 4 YT
 Episode 5 YT
 Episode 6 YT
 Episode 7 YT
 Episode 8 YT
 Episode 9 YT
 Episode 10 YT
 Episode 11 YT
 Highest, Longest, Most YT
 Evan Smith MVP YT
 Birdhouse Detroit Extras YT

King of the Road 2015

Teams 
The 2015 teams were announced August 25, 2015. The Mystery guests were announced September 2, 2015.
Team Birdhouse was the winner. Elijah Berle was the MVP. In 2016 this season of King of the Road aired as eleven hour-long TV episodes on the VICELAND channel.

Web Episodes 
 Meet the Mystery Guests YT

King of the Road 2016

Teams 
The 2016 teams were announced  October 14, 2016.
Team Enjoi was the winner. Jackson Pilz was the MVP. In 2017 this season of King of the Road aired as eleven hour-long TV episodes on the VICELAND channel.

King of the Road 2017

Teams 
The 2017 teams were announced  July 6, 2017.
Team Element was the winner. Evan Smith was the MVP. This season of King of the Road aired in 2018 as eleven hour-long TV episodes on the VICELAND channel and the Thrasher website.

References

External links
 Official Web Page
 King of the Road 2003 at Skatevideosite.com
 King of the Road 2004 at Skatevideosite.com
 King of the Road 2005 at Skatevideosite.com
 King of the Road 2006 at Skatevideosite.com
 King of the Road 2007 at Skatevideosite.com

Skateboarding competitions